Cecil B. Leeson (16 December 1902 – 17 April 1989), a musician and teacher, was widely credited with establishing the saxophone as a legitimate concert instrument in the U.S.

Early life
While living in the southwest, he received a degree from the Tempe Normal School of the Arizona State Teacher's College. He then began engineering study at the University of Arizona, at which point he began playing saxophone. In 1921, Cecil Leeson enrolled as a saxophone major in Dana's Musical Institute in Warren, Ohio (currently part of Youngstown State University), graduating in 1925.

Career

From 1926, he worked on occasion in various commercial groups in Detroit, and in Ohio, including broadcasts on Cleveland's radio station WHK and WJAY. Musicians Guy Lombardo and his brother Carmen were then active in Cleveland, and Leeson began directing the Lombardo School of Saxophone by early 1927, which Carmen had started in 1926. His approach to classical saxophone playing differed from jazz and dance saxophone music popular at the time, and helped promote classical saxophone style in a mainstream medium.

A writer in the Hollywood News said that "in  Leeson's capable hands, the saxophone [is] no longer the blatant jazz instrument of popular conception, but an instrument of really beautiful tone color [...]. If there were other saxophonists who could play as Leeson does, the saxophone would speedily make its appearance in the symphony orchestra."

During the early 1930s, he joined the faculty at the Hollywood Conservatory of Music and taught there for several years. He considered his formal "concert debut" to have been a Hollywood Conservatory recital on 11 June 1931. By 1934 he was working and performing in New York, including an October 1934 recital at The Barbizon Hotel. In July 1936 he visited a series of midwestern and southwestern U.S. campuses offering summer musical institutes. The following summer Leeson taught at the National Music Camp in Interlochen, Michigan, as he did in 1939.

From 1934 to 1939, Leeson collaborated with American composer Paul Creston, resulting in several major pieces for the classical saxophone repertoire, which they premiered. Leeson and Creston recorded the composer's "Suite" (a-sax/pno) in 1938 for New Music Quarterly Recordings (catalog 1314-A-B).(

On 5 February 1937, Cecil Leeson was the first saxophonist to play at Town Hall in New York City. He was also one of the first saxophonists to appear as a soloist with major American symphony orchestras.  More than 50 works for saxophone were written for him by composers such as Leon Stein, Edvard Moritz, Paul Creston, and Ferde Grofé.

Leeson taught saxophone performance at Northwestern University from 1955 to 1961 and then at Ball State University.  His papers and his collection of original Adolphe Sax and other famous saxophones are in the America's National Music Museum at the University of South Dakota.

The 2nd World Saxophone Congress in Chicago in 1970, "honored Leeson for 50 years of pioneering and contributing to the establishment of the saxophone in the field of music".

According to Stephen Cottrell, "Leeson's style of saxophone performance established in the United States a school of classical saxophone playing that differed from the European model."

References

External links
 "The Cecil B. Leeson Saxophone Collection and Archive", National Music Museum.

Bibliography
 Mark Hulsebos, Cecil Leeson: the pioneering of the concert saxophone in America from 1921 to 1941, Publisher Ball State University, 1989.

1989 deaths
1902 births
20th-century American male musicians
American classical saxophonists
20th-century classical musicians
20th-century American saxophonists